Micrasterias furcata is a species of unicellular desmid which inhabits freshwater areas. M. furcata is round, flattened and lobed in body plan.

Description
M. furcata generally has a sphere-like body shape, with five lobes on each side, all 10 of the lobes divide into two other much smaller lobes which makes one side of M. furcata have 15 lobes (while also including those which divide into smaller lobes).

References

Desmidiaceae